(Latin: "The health (welfare, good, salvation, felicity) of the people should be the supreme law", "Let the good (or safety) of the people be the supreme (or highest) law", or "The welfare of the people shall be the supreme law") is a maxim or principle found in Cicero's De Legibus (book III, part III, sub. VIII).

Uses 

John Locke uses it as the epigraph in the form  in his Second Treatise on Government and refers to it as a fundamental rule for government. It was the inscription on the cornet of Roundhead and Leveller William Rainsborowe during the English Civil War. This motto was also endorsed by Hobbes at the beginning of Chapter 30 of Leviathan and by Spinoza in Chapter 19 of his Theological-Political Treatise. It was frequently quoted as  since at least 1737.

In the United States, the phrase is the state motto of Missouri and the University of Missouri, and accepted, like many other states, as an element of its state seal.  It is also used for Manassas Park, Virginia, and the Duquesne University School of Law. It is also on the seal of the North Carolina Medical Board.

In the United Kingdom, these coats of arms include the City of Salford, the London Borough of Lewisham, Eastleigh, Harrow, Southport, Lytham St. Anne's, Mid Sussex, West Lancashire, Swinton and Pendlebury, Urmston and Willenhall;

It is the motto of the Thomas R. Kline School of Law of Duquesne University.

The motto was featured on the masthead of the Irish medical journal Medical Press and Circular.

The monument to the 1914-1918 1940-1945 Belgian infantry (place Poelaert, Brussels) includes on its western face (opposite to the avenue Louise) salus patriæ suprema lex.

A misquotation, was used as an epigraph for the third pamphlet of the White Rose.

Gallery

See also
 Salus

References

Brocards (law)
Constitutional law
Latin mottos
Latin political words and phrases
Philosophy of law
American political catchphrases
Latin legal terminology
Symbols of Missouri
State mottos of the United States
Media and communications in the London Borough of Lewisham
Cicero